Iraqi Armenians are people born, raised, or residing in Iraq, with origins in the area known as the Armenian Highlands, which lies between the Caucasus Mountains and Anatolia.

List

Arts
 Apo Avedissian - filmmaker, painter, photographer, and writer
 Vartan Malakian - artist and father of Daron Malakian

Business
 Calouste Gulbenkian - businessman and philanthropist
 Kevork Hovnanian - builder and businessman

Literature
 Shant Kenderian - writer

Music
 Seta Hagopian - singer
 Daron Malakian - guitarist and member of the band System of a Down
 Beatrice Ohanessian - pianist

Politics
Esabelle Dingizian - politician 
Murad Artin - politician

Religion
 Torkom Manoogian - Armenian Patriarch of Jerusalem
 Avak Asadourian - Primate of the Armenian Diocese in Iraq

Science
 Ara Darzi, Baron Darzi of Denham - surgeon and politician

Various
 Silva Shahakian - beauty contestant

See also
Armenians in Iraq
List of Armenians

References

Armenians
Iraqi
Main|Armenian
Armenian